Capys is a genus of butterflies in the family Lycaenidae. The species of this genus are found in the Afrotropical realm.

Conservation of the name
In 1819, Jacob Hübner published the generic name Scoptes, including three species but without designating a type. The generic name was more or less forgotten afterwards. In 1966, Norman Denbigh Riley, for practical reasons, selected Papilio alphaeus Cramer, 1777, as the type species of Scoptes, by which Scoptes became an objective synonym of Capys, and started a case to suppress the name Scoptes for purposes of priority. In 1986, the International Commission on Zoological Nomenclature suppressed the name Scoptes (for the principle of priority not principle of homonymy) in order to conserve the name Capys Hewitson.

Species
Capys alphaeus (Cramer, [1777])
Capys bamendanus Schultze, 1909
Capys bamptoni Henning & Henning, 1988
Capys brunneus Aurivillius, 1916
Capys calpurnia Henning & Henning, 1988
Capys catharus Riley, 1932
Capys collinsi Henning & Henning, 1988
Capys connexivus Butler, 1897
Capys cupreus Henning & Henning, 1988
Capys disjunctus Trimen, 1895
Capys hermes Henning & Henning, 1988
Capys juliae Henning & Henning, 1988
Capys meruensis Henning & Henning, 1988
Capys penningtoni Riley, 1932
Capys stuarti Collins & Larsen, 2000
Capys usambarae Congdon & Collins, 1998
Capys vorgasi Larsen & Collins, 2003

References

External links

"Capys Hewitson, 1865" at Markku Savela's Lepidoptera and Some Other Life Forms

 
Deudorigini
Lycaenidae genera
Taxa named by William Chapman Hewitson